The Rose Garden is the self-titled and only album from the American folk rock group of the same name. It was released in April 1968 on Atco Records and included their Top 20 hit "Next Plane to London".

The band was heavily influenced by the Byrds' style of vocal harmony and 12-string guitar blending and the album includes two Gene Clark compositions, "Till Today" and "Long Time". The group also recorded "Rider", which was first recorded by the Byrds in 1966, but not yet released. The only original composition was "Flower Town". Originally issued by Atco Records, it was reissued on CD by Collector's Choice Music.  Atco's current distributing label Rhino Records has made this album available for digital downloads.

Track listing

Side one 
 "Next Plane to London" (Kenny Gist, Jr.)
 "I'm Only Second" (Charles W. Higgins, Pat Vegas)
 "February Sunshine" (Pat Vegas, Val Geary)
 "Coins of Fun" (Leonard A. Metzger, Pat Vegas)
 "Rider" (Traditional; arranged by Bruce Boudin, Diana Di Rose, James Groshong, John Noreen and William Fleming)

Side two 
 "She Belongs to Me" (Bob Dylan)
 "Flower Town" (Bruce Boudin, Diana Di Rose, James Groshong, John Noreen, Kim Fowley, William Fleming)
 "Till Today" (Gene Clark)
 "Look What You've Done" (Bob Johnston, Wes Farrell)
 "Long Time" (Gene Clark)

Personnel
John Noreen - lead guitar
James Groshong - guitar, vocals
Diana Di Rose - acoustic guitar, vocals
William Fleming - bass
Bruce Boudin - drums

References

1968 debut albums
The Rose Garden (band) albums
Atco Records albums
Albums recorded at Gold Star Studios